Many assembly segments in India became defunct when the electoral map was redrawn in 2008. Even in 20th C, map was often redrawn. Some of the defunct seats are the subject of enquiry here.

Bhavani Peth Vidhan Sabha Seat 
It was part of Pune Lok Sabha constituency

1967 Election 
 T. D. Memjade (INC) : 25,883 
 M. B. Sawant (RPI) : 16,493

1972 Election 
 Memjade Tikamdas Daduram (Congress) 34,677 votes
 Keshavkantji Janjot (SOP) : 14125

Dadar Vidhan Sabha Seat 
Dadar is a suburb of Mumbai. 
See : Dadar Assembly constituency

Mahim Vidhan Sabha Seat 
Mahim is a suburb of Mumbai, next to Matunga and Dadar. 
 This is not a defunct seat. It still exists, as of 2020.

Matunga Vidhan Sabha Seat 
Matunga is a suburb of Mumbai, next to Dadar. 
See : Matunga Assembly constituency

Shukrawar Peth Vidhan Sabha Seat  
It was part of Pune Lok Sabha constituency

1962 Election 
 Rambhau Vithal Telang (INC) 28,434 votes
 Shridhar Mahadev Joshi (PSP) 19,263 votes

1967 Election 
 R. K. Mhalgi, a.k.a., Rambhau Mhalgi (BJS) 31,265 votes
 B. P. Apte (Congress) 14,146 votes

1972 Election 
 Ramchandra K. Mhalgi (Jana Sangh) : 41,792 votes
 Vasant Thorat (INC) : 40,195 votes

References

Former assembly constituencies of Maharashtra